Mardock railway station served the village of Wareside, Hertfordshire, England, from 1863 to 1964 by the Buntingford branch line.

History 
The station was opened on 3 July 1863 by the Great Eastern Railway. It was situated on the west side of the road leading to Mardocks Farm. It was known as Mardocks in RCH handbook and Mardock for Wakeside in the 1882 Great Eastern Railway timetable as well as the 1880s editions of Bradshaw. On the north side of the level crossing was a signal box that controlled a siding which served a goods yard and a cattle dock. Goods services ceased on 6 March 1961. The station closed on 16 November 1964. The station building was demolished in 1975.

References 

Disused railway stations in Hertfordshire
Former Great Eastern Railway stations
Railway stations in Great Britain opened in 1863
Railway stations in Great Britain closed in 1964
1863 establishments in England
1964 disestablishments in England
Beeching closures in England
Wareside